The 2008–09 UEFA Cup was the 38th season of the UEFA Cup football tournament. The final was played at the Şükrü Saracoğlu Stadium, home ground of Fenerbahçe, in Istanbul on 20 May 2009. This season was the final one to use the UEFA Cup format; starting in 2009, the competition was known as the UEFA Europa League. Ukraine's Shakhtar Donetsk beat Werder Bremen 2–1 after extra time to win their first European title. Zenit Saint Petersburg were the defending champions but were eliminated by Udinese in the Round of 16.

Association team allocation
A total of 157 teams from 53 UEFA associations participated in the 2008–09 UEFA Cup. Associations were allocated places according to their 2007 UEFA league coefficients, which takes into account their performance in European competitions from 2002–03 to 2006–07.

Below is the qualification scheme for the 2008–09 UEFA Cup:
Associations 1–6 each have three teams qualify
Associations 7 and 8 each have four teams qualify
Associations 9–15 and 22-51 each have two teams qualify, except Liechtenstein, which has one team qualify (as Liechtenstein only has a domestic cup and no domestic league)
Associations 16–21 each have three teams qualify
Associations 52 and 53 each have one team qualify
plus
The top three associations of the 2007–08 UEFA Fair Play ranking each gain an additional berth
11 winners of the 2008 UEFA Intertoto Cup
16 losers from the UEFA Champions League third qualifying round
8 third-placed teams from the UEFA Champions League group stage

Association ranking

Notes
(FP): Additional fair play berth (Denmark, England, Germany)
(UCL): Additional teams transferred from the UEFA Champions League

Distribution
Since the winners of the 2007–08 UEFA Cup, Zenit Saint Petersburg, qualified for the 2008–09 UEFA Champions League through domestic performance, the title holder spot reserved for them in the playoff round was vacated. As a result, the following changes to the default allocation system were made to compensate for the vacant title holder spot in the group stage:

The domestic cup winners of associations 14 (Turkey) was promoted from the second qualifying round to the play-off round.
The first UEFA Cup entrant of associations 19 and 20 (Israel and Serbia) were promoted from the first qualifying round to the second qualifying round.

Redistribution rules

A UEFA Cup place is vacated when a team qualifies for both the Champions League and the UEFA Cup, or qualifies for the UEFA Cup by more than one method. When a place is vacated, it is redistributed within the national association by the following rules:
 When the domestic cup winners (considered as the "highest-placed" qualifiers within the national association) also qualify for the Champions League, their UEFA Cup place is vacated, and the remaining UEFA Cup qualifiers are moved up one place, with the final place (with the earliest starting round) taken by the domestic cup runners-up, provided they do not already qualify for the Champions League or the UEFA Cup. Otherwise, this place is taken by the highest-placed league finishers that have not yet qualified for the European competitions.
 When the domestic cup winners also qualify for the UEFA Cup through league position, their place through the league position is vacated, and the UEFA Cup qualifiers that finish lower in the league are moved up one place, with the final place taken by the highest-placed league finishers that have not yet qualified for the UEFA Cup.
 A place vacated by the League Cup winners is taken by the highest-placed league finishers that have not yet qualified for the UEFA Cup.
 A Fair Play place is taken by the highest-ranked team in the domestic Fair Play table that has not yet qualified for the Champions League or the UEFA Cup.

Teams

Notes

Round and draw dates 
The calendar shows the dates of the rounds and draw.

Qualifying rounds

First qualifying round
The draw for the first qualifying round took place on 1 July 2008. The first legs were played on 17 July 2008 and the second legs were played on 31 July 2008, with the exception of the Nordsjælland vs TVMK match, which was played on 29 July 2008.

|-
!colspan="5"|Southern-Mediterranean region

|-
!colspan="5"|Central-East region

|-
!colspan="5"|Northern region

|}

In each region of the draw for the first qualifying round, teams were divided into two pots, on the basis of UEFA coefficients.  The lower pots contained unranked teams from associations 34–53, together with Vėtra of Lithuania (the 33rd association).  The higher pots contained teams from associations 1–32, together with Sūduva of Lithuania, and FH (who had a team ranking, 209).

Three of the 37 ties were won by the lower ranked team, all involving teams whose ranking was that of their association: WIT Georgia (Georgia, ranked 38) beat Spartak Trnava (Slovakia, 24); Vllaznia (Albania, 43) beat Koper (Slovenia, 29); and St Patrick's Athletic (Ireland, 35) beat Olimps (Latvia, 31).

Second qualifying round
The draw for the second qualifying round was held on 1 August 2008 in Nyon, Switzerland, and featured 16 teams entering directly at the second qualifying round, as well as the 37 winners from the previous round and the 11 third round winners of the UEFA Intertoto Cup. The first legs were played on 14 August 2008 and the second leg on 28 August 2008.

Because there are an odd number of teams in the Central and Northern groups in the 2nd qualifying round, UEFA moved Rennes from the Central-East group to the Northern group. Furthermore, Liepājas Metalurgs and Sūduva were moved from the Northern group to the Central-East group, and Vaslui and Interblock Ljubljana were moved from the Southern-Mediterranean group to the Central-East group. It is unknown why UEFA decided on these last moves since it is not strictly required. One of the reasons could be to have more balance in the groups with respect to the coefficients.

|-
!colspan="5"|Southern-Mediterranean region

|-
!colspan="5"|Central-East region

|-
!colspan="5"|Northern region

|}

In each region of the draw for the second qualifying round, teams were divided into two pots, on the basis of UEFA coefficients.  The higher pots contained teams with a ranking of 176 or higher, and unranked teams from associations ranked 1 to 15 (or 17 in the Southern-Mediterranean region).

12 of the 32 ties were won by the lower-ranked team. The 12 teams that lost to a lower team were: AEK Athens, Dnipro Dnipropetrovsk, Aris, Red Star Belgrade, Grasshopper, Slovan Liberec, Viking, Lokomotiv Sofia, Elfsborg, Gent, Queen of the South and Debrecen. St Patrick's Athletic were the only team to beat a higher-seeded team in each of the two qualifying rounds.

First round

32 teams entered the tournament at the first round, along with the 32 winners from the previous round and the 16 losers from the Champions League third qualifying round. The 80 teams were then split into eight groups of ten teams; five seeded teams and five unseeded teams. The draw was based on their coefficient ranking with one exception: no country can have multiple teams in any group.  Teams ranked 108 or higher were seeded, as were unranked teams from England and Spain.

The draw, which was conducted by UEFA General Secretary David Taylor, was held on Friday, 29 August 2008 at 13:00 CET in Monaco. The matches were played on 18 September and 2 October 2008.

|-
!colspan="5"|Group 1

|-
!colspan="5"|Group 2

|-
!colspan="5"|Group 3

|-
!colspan="5"|Group 4

|-
!colspan="5"|Group 5

|-
!colspan="5"|Group 6

|-
!colspan="5"|Group 7

|-
!colspan="5"|Group 8

|}

Nine of the 40 ties were won by the unseeded team.  The nine seeded losing teams, with their ranking, were: Everton (50), Rapid București (58), Beşiktaş (60), Sparta Prague (68), Dinamo București (69), Levski Sofia (80), Austria Wien (82), Rennes (97) and Hapoel Tel Aviv (108).

Group stage

The draw for the group stage of the 2008–09 UEFA Cup was held at UEFA Headquarters in Nyon, Switzerland, on 7 October 2008. The 40 teams in the draw were divided into five pots based on their UEFA coefficients. The eight teams with the highest UEFA coefficient were allocated to Pot 1, the next eight teams to Pot 2, and so on. One team from each pot was drawn for each group, with the restriction that no team could be drawn with one from the same country.

The top three teams (highlighted in green) of each group qualified for the next round. Based on paragraph 6.06 in the UEFA regulations for the current season, if two or more teams are equal on points on completion of the group matches, the following criteria are applied to determine the rankings:
superior goal difference from all group matches played;
higher number of goals scored;
higher number of goals scored away;
higher number of wins;
higher number of away wins;
higher number of coefficient points accumulated by the club in question, as well as its association, over the previous five seasons.

Group A

Group B

Group C

Group D

Group E

Group F

Group G

Group H

Knockout stage

Except for the final round, the rounds in the final phase are two-legged. In the event of aggregate scores being equal after normal time in the second leg, the winning team will be that which scored more goals on their away leg: if the scores in the two matches were identical, extra time is played. The away goals rule also applies if scores are equal at the end of extra time. If there are no goals scored in extra time, the tie is decided on a penalty shoot-out. The team first out of the hat in each tie plays the first leg of their tie at home, and the second leg away.

The draw for the Round of 32 was held on Friday, 19 December 2008 in Nyon, Switzerland. The draw was conducted by UEFA General Secretary David Taylor, Giorgio Marchetti, UEFA's director of professional football and 2009 UEFA Cup Final ambassador Can Bartu. In this round, each UEFA Cup group winner paired with the third-placed team from another UEFA Cup group and each UEFA Cup group runner-up paired with a third-placed team from the UEFA Champions League, with the only restriction on the draw being that teams from the same national association could not be drawn together. The UEFA Cup group winners and runners-up each played the second leg of their Round of 32 ties at home.

The draw for the Round of 16 also took place on 19 December 2008, immediately after the draw for the Round of 32. Each tie in the Round of 32 was numbered, and teams were drawn for the Round of 16 as "Winners of match 1", "Winners of match 2", etc. Unlike the Round of 32, teams from the same group or country may be drawn together from the Round of 16 onwards, meaning that they were entirely randomly drawn.

The draws for the quarterfinals and semifinals were both held on Friday, 20 March 2009 in Nyon, Switzerland. The draw was conducted by David Taylor and Can Bartu.

Bracket

Round of 32
The first legs were played on 18 February and 19 February, and the second leg matches were played on 26 February 2009.

Manchester City were the only team from the first qualifying round to reach the Round of 16. Braga were the only team from the Intertoto Cup to reach the Round of 16 and were therefore awarded the title of Intertoto Cup winners.

Of the eight teams who had been placed in Pot 5 of the group stage draw, only Metalist Kharkiv and Saint-Étienne reached the Round of 16. Of the eight teams that entered the Round of the 32 from the UEFA Champions League group stage, two lost: Fiorentina and Bordeaux. Of the eight ties between a third-placed team and a first-placed team from the UEFA Cup group stage, two were won by the third-placed team; the winners were Braga and Paris Saint-Germain.

Round of 16
The first leg matches were played on 12 March, and the second leg matches were played on 18 March and 19 March 2009.

Quarter-finals
The first legs were played on 9 April and the second legs were played on 16 April.

Semi-finals
The first legs were played on 30 April and the second legs on 7 May.

Final

The final of the 2008–09 UEFA Cup was held on 20 May 2009 at the Şükrü Saracoğlu Stadium in Istanbul, Turkey. This was the first time that the UEFA Cup Final had been held in Turkey and followed the 2005 UEFA Champions League Final, which was held in Istanbul's Atatürk Olympic Stadium.

Top goalscorers

Source: Hammond, Mike, ed (2009). The European Football Yearbook 2009/10. London: Carlton Books. .

See also
2008–09 UEFA Champions League
2008 UEFA Intertoto Cup
2009 UEFA Super Cup

References

External links

2008–09 All matches UEFA Cup – season at UEFA website
2008/09 UEFA Cup - results and line-ups (archive)
 All scorers 2008–09 UEFA Cup according to (excluding preliminary round) according to protocols UEFA + all scorers preliminary round

 
2008-09
2